The  is a city tram station on the Takaoka Kidō Line located in Takaoka, Toyama Prefecture, Japan.

Surrounding area
Suehirochō Shōtengai
Otayadōri Shōtengai

Adjacent stations

Railway stations in Toyama Prefecture